Convolvulus lineatus is a species of perennial herb in the family Convolvulaceae. They have a self-supporting growth form and simple, broad leaves. Individuals can grow to 25 cm tall.

Sources

References 

lineatus
Flora of Malta